Óscar Viel y Toro (1837 – September 1, 1892) was a Chilean navy officer. From 1867 to 1874 he was governor of governor of Punta Arenas in the Straits of Magellan.

References

1837 births
1892 deaths
People from Santiago
Chilean Navy personnel of the Chincha Islands War
Chilean Navy personnel of the War of the Pacific
19th-century Chilean Navy personnel
Chilean Navy officers
Governors of Magallanes